Australian Rules, is a 2002 Australian sports drama film directed by Paul Goldman and starring Nathan Phillips, Luke Carroll, Tom Budge, Brian Torry and Lisa Flanagan. It was adapted from the novels Deadly, Unna? (1998) and Nukkin Ya by Phillip Gwynne. The film is about a young man experiencing the hardships of growing up in rural South Australia. In particular, it deals with the issue of racial relationships through the central characters, their involvement in local Australian rules football, and Aboriginal players. It was launched at the Adelaide Festival of Arts on 5 March 2002, and nationwide on 29 August 2002.

Plot
In the isolated and fictional South Australian fishing town of Prospect Bay, the only thing that connects the black and white communities is football. Gary "Blacky" Black (Nathan Phillips) and Dumby Red (Luke Carroll) are an exception; teenage best friends from different sides of the tracks. Dumby is the star of the football team and likely to become the next Aboriginal star in the big leagues. Gary is the bookish son of hard-drinking and brutal fisherman Bob Black (Simon Westaway). He is attracted to Dumby's sister, Clarence (Lisa Flanagan). Blacky's supportive mother helps him become a better player as he is chosen to be the ruckman in the team's upcoming grand final. Blacky has to overcome Thumper, the star player for the opposition. When gameday arrives Blacky at first struggles to make an impact on the game but Dumby inspires the team, kicking several goals. When Dumby gets a mark near goals with the scores tied he hands it off to a teammate instead of taking the shot. The player kicks a point and Blacky has to run into Thumper to stop him from kicking the winning goal. Their team wins the premiership, but Dumby and Blacky's elation is short-lived. Dumby is passed over for the best-on-ground medal for the coach's son Simon Robertson. Dumby is disgusted and angered by the obvious racially motivated decision.

Disgruntled, Dumby and his cousin Pretty (Tony Briggs) attempt to rob the bar where the celebrations were held, hoping to find the best-on-ground medal. After breaking into the bar, they meet the drunk owner, beat him into unconsciousness and proceed to the safe with the key found in his pocket. Bob, waking to find the owner unconscious with a head wound, heads to the office and loads a double-barrelled shotgun. Bob sneaks up behind Dumby and fires a shot into the figure in the darkness. Bob discovers he has killed Dumby. Pretty, who has been hiding behind the door, jumps him and points the gun at his neck. Pretty reveals himself by removing his makeshift balaclava. He does not shoot Bob but fires the remaining round into the ceiling and runs away into the darkness. Bob is questioned by police over the shooting but is let off on the grounds of self-defence. Blacky is devastated over Dumby's death and angrily tosses his premiership trophy into the ocean. Clarence and Blacky console each other and fall in love. Bob and the family are greeted with hostility and harassed by some local Aboriginal people which only further fuels Bob's violent temper and bigotry.

Clarence sneaks into Blacky's room one night and they make love. The next morning Bob discovers them in bed and beats Blacky. He racially insults Clarence and throws her out. Fed up with his father, Blacky leaves. Blacky meets with Dumby's family and attends his funeral. He acquires the best on ground medal and places it in Dumby's casket. After returning home he is confronted by Bob and is told he is no longer welcome in his house due to his relationship with Clarence. Blacky defiantly stands still even after Bob punches him repeatedly. Defeated and exhausted, Bob leaves the family never to come back. The football team is disbanded as no Aboriginal players show up to training or games. The film ends with Blacky and Clarence jumping into the ocean and swimming in the water. Blacky narrates that they will both be leaving soon, as there is nothing left for them in this town.

Cast
 Nathan Phillips as Gary "Blacky" Black
 Simon Westaway as Bob Black
 Celia Ireland as Liz Black
 Harrison Gilbertson as Greggy
 Kelton Pell as Tommy Red
 Luke Carroll as Dumby Red
 Tony Briggs as Pretty Red
 Lisa Flanagan as Clarence Red
 Tom Budge as Pickles
 Kevin Harrington as Mr. Robertson "Arks"
 Martin Vaughan as Darcy

Accolades

References

External links
 
Australian Rules at Oz Movies
 
 
 Australian Rules at the National Film and Sound Archive

2002 films
ARIA Award-winning albums
2002 directorial debut films
2000s sports drama films
Australian sports drama films
Films shot in Adelaide
Films shot in South Australia
Australian rules football films
Films based on Australian novels
Films about race and ethnicity
Films about interracial romance
Films set in South Australia
2002 drama films
2000s English-language films
Films about Aboriginal Australians